Tikrasqa (Quechua tikray to turn upside down, -sqa a suffix, "turned upside down", also spelled Tijraskha) is a mountain in the Bolivian Andes which reaches a height of approximately . It is located in the Cochabamba Department, Quillacollo Province, Sipe Sipe Municipality.

References 

Mountains of Cochabamba Department